Susan Scott Rae (born 2 June 1956) is a Scottish newsreader and continuity announcer on BBC Radio 4, BBC Radio 3 and BBC Radio 4 Extra.

Rae was born and raised in Dundee, Scotland, and read English at Edinburgh University. She left the university before her finals, and began work with D. C. Thomson newspapers in Dundee, before taking up work on BBC Radio Aberdeen. After three years there, she left to work in London in the early 1980s as a continuity announcer and newsreader on BBC Radio 4. The response to her voice on Radio 4 at this time was negative; some listeners believed the BBC's commitment to accurate pronunciation was in decline.

Later in the 1980s she moved to daytime television, co-presenting Open Air, and continued with voiceover work when the show ended. Rae began working on the BBC World Service around 2000, returning to BBC Radio 4 in 2003.

She has done voiceovers for many Discovery Channel shows (including some episodes of Forensic Detectives and The FBI Files), and for Bravo's series Street Crime UK. In 2007, she presented Eastern Skies for Anglia Television.

Personal life
Rae lives in London. She is a humanist celebrant.

References

External links

1950s births
Living people
Alumni of the University of Edinburgh
BBC newsreaders and journalists
BBC Radio 4
BBC World Service people
British radio personalities
People from Dundee
Radio and television announcers
Journalists from Dundee
Scottish humanists